Fundación Lucentum Baloncesto Alicante, also known as HLA Alicante for sponsorship reasons, is a professional basketball team based in Alicante, Valencian Community.

History
The club was founded on 17 June 2015 with the aim to save the basketball in the city after the financial problems of the main club CB Lucentum.

Fundación Lucentum made its debut in the 2015–16 LEB Plata season after receiving the spot of CB Lucentum. On 23 December 2018, the club achieved their first title after defeating 86–68 CB Zamora in the Copa LEB Plata, played during the 2018–19 season.

The head coach Gonzalo García de Vitoria will leave the club after the 2022-23 season, and be replaced by Rafa Monclova.

Season by season

Players

Current roster

Depth chart

Trophies
Copa LEB Plata: (1)
2018

References

External links
Fundación Lucentum Baloncesto Official Website

Lucentum
CB Lucentum Alicante
LEB Plata teams
Basketball teams established in 2015
2015 establishments in the Valencian Community
Sport in Alicante